"In This Time" is a song by Canadian rock band The Tea Party. It was released as a single in Australia.

"In This Time" is a folk inspired composition written for Gibson harp guitar.

Track listing 
"In This Time"
"Haze on the Hills"
"Winter Solstice"

References 

1994 singles
1993 songs